Novosyolovsky (masculine), Novosyolovskaya (feminine), or Novosyolovskoye (neuter) is the name of several rural localities in Russia:
Novosyolovsky, Kursk Oblast, a settlement in Kursky District of Kursk Oblast
Novosyolovsky, Krasnodar Krai, a khutor in Belorechensky District of Krasnodar Krai
Novosyolovskoye, a village under the administrative jurisdiction of the urban-type settlement of Ponazyrevo, Kostroma Oblast